Pantepec may refer to:

Pantepec, Chiapas
Pantepec, Puebla
Pantepec River
 Pantepec Municipality, Chiapas
 Pantepec Municipality, Puebla